Mondo Media is an American multimedia company that mainly produces online animation aimed at teens and young adults. The company was founded in 1988 by John Evershed and Deirdre O'Malley in San Francisco, California.  

Before Mondo Mini Shows, the company initially created content for various tech companies, before developing two video games, Critical Path in 1993 and The Daedalus Encounter in 1995, under the name Mechadeus. In the latter half of the 1990s, Mondo refocused on producing internet-based animation, which became the company's main business.

Mondo's most successful and popular shows are Happy Tree Friends, which has since spawned a multimedia franchise; and Dick Figures, which was adapted into a feature-length film and was nominated for an Annie Award.

According to AdAge Magazine in January 2013, Mondo Media was the top-ranked and all-time most popular YouTube channel, with 1.3 billion views and 1.3 million subscribers.

Mondo Media and 6 Point Harness finalized a merger of their two companies in 2016. The company uses the 6 Point Harness name for studio and production services, and Mondo Media branding for consumer

Television

In 2013, Canadian channel Bite teamed up with Mondo Media and YouTube to create Bite on Mondo, a program in which content creators pitched ideas for new shows. The pitches are funded through Mondo and use YouTube's popularity to decide whether or not they will be picked up. The winning pitches were broadcast on Bite on August 29, 2014.

In October 2014, parent company Blue Ant Media, along with Mondo Media and Corus Entertainment announced that Teletoon would air a new series featuring shorts from the program. It was expected to premiere in 2016 on Teletoon at Night, but instead premiered on September 4, 2015 as Night Sweats on Adult Swim Canada.

In 2015, Mondo Media produced the sketch comedy series Like, Share, Die for Fusion, consisting of several short segments and episodes of Mondo-produced web series.

In May 2019, El Rey Network aired an anthology of Mondo series called the Mondo Animation Hour.

Web series

Failed pilots

Feature films

Graphic and art design

Video games

Television shows

References

External links
Mondo Media official website
Mondo Media on YouTube

American flash animated web series
Mondo Mini Shows
Adult animation studios
1988 establishments in California
Companies based in San Francisco
Mass media companies established in 1988